"Misisipi" Mike Wolf is an American singer, songwriter and musician. He currently resides in San Francisco, California, United States. His music has been compared to that of Johnny Cash, Willie Nelson and Waylon Jennings. His music has been featured on nationally broadcast radio and television and has been twice voted as "Best Singer/Songwriter" by readers of the San Francisco Bay Guardian.

References

Living people
American male singer-songwriters
American singer-songwriters
Year of birth missing (living people)